Lifupa Airport  is an airport serving the village of Lifupa, Republic of Malawi.

See also
Transport in Malawi

References
Directory of Airports in Malawi
 Google Earth

External links

Airports in Malawi